Motoyuki (written: 源幸, 素幸, 素之 or 元之) is a masculine Japanese given name. Notable people with the name include:

 (born 1970), Japanese baseball player
 (born 1963), Japanese politician
 (born 1952), Japanese composer
 (born 1886), Japanese journalist and activist

Japanese masculine given names